The president of Romania is the head of state of Romania. Following a modification to the Romanian Constitution in 2003, the president is directly elected by a two-round system and serves for five years. An individual may serve two terms. During their term in office, the president may not be a formal member of a political party.

The office of president was created in 1974, when Communist leader Nicolae Ceaușescu elevated the presidency of the State Council to a fully fledged executive presidency. It took its current form in stages after the Romanian Revolution—Ion Iliescu deposed Ceaușescu, resulting in the adoption of Romania's current constitution in 1991.

Klaus Iohannis is the incumbent president since his inauguration on 21 December 2014. Iohannis is of full Transylvanian Saxon descent, making him the first president from Romania's German minority.

Communist era 

In the Communist era, the president was elected for a five-year term by the Great National Assembly (GNA) on the recommendation of the Romanian Communist Party's Central Committee and the Front of Socialist Unity and Democracy, with no term limits. Ceaușescu was the only holder of the office under this system; he was elected by the GNA in 1974 and reelected in 1980 and 1985, each time unopposed. The president continued to serve as ex officio president of the State Council, and had the right to act on any matter that did not require a State Council plenum. He also appointed and dismissed ministers and heads of central agencies. When the GNA was not in session (in practice, for most of the year), the president could appoint and dismiss the president of the Supreme Court and the prosecutor general without State Council's approval; indeed, he was not even required to consult his State Council colleagues when making such decisions. Ceaușescu created the office in order to make himself chief decision-maker in both name and fact. Previously, he had nominally been first among equals on the State Council, deriving his real power from his leadership of the Communist Party. In practice, he used his power to act on all matters that did not require a plenum to rule by decree. Over time, he also usurped many powers that constitutionally belonged to the State Council as a whole.

Oath of office 

After the Constitutional Court acknowledges the legality of the election, the Houses of Parliament meet in a joint session. The elected President takes the following oath of office, specified by article 82 of the Constitution:

I solemnly swear that I will dedicate all my strength and the best of my ability for the spiritual and material welfare of the Romanian people, to abide by the Constitution and laws of the country, to defend democracy, the fundamental rights and freedoms of my fellow-citizens, Romania's sovereignty, independence, unity and territorial integrity. So help me God!

Powers and duties 

Under the 1991 Constitution, which was amended in 2003, presidential powers were curtailed in contrast to communist Romania; the office continues to wield significant influence within a semi-presidential system of government.

The president's duties are set out in Title III, Chapter II of the Constitution. These are not exclusive, and are supplemented by other constitutional and legal provisions.

In home affairs:
 Embodies the state and safeguards its independence, unity and territorial integrity.
 Guards the observance of the Constitution and the functioning of public authorities.
 Designates and appoints the Prime Minister, subject to parliamentary approval (the President cannot dismiss the Prime Minister).
 Appoints and removes ministers, on the advice of the Prime Minister (a proposal by the Prime Minister may be rejected only once; in such cases, the Prime Minister cannot re-submit the same nomination for ministerial office; the President cannot refuse the appointment of a second, different, nominee).
 Consults the Government on major policy matters.
 Chairs Government when matters of national interest with regard to foreign policy, the defence of the country or public order are debated and, at the Prime Minister's request, in other instances as well.
 Addresses Parliament on issues of national interest.
 Assents to bills (the President may ask Parliament to reconsider a bill only once).
 Refers bills for review to the Constitutional Court before signifying his assent. 
 Summons Parliament after a legislative election.
 Requests extraordinary sessions of Parliament.
 Dissolves Parliament (The President may dissolve Parliament if no vote of confidence has been obtained to form a government within 60 days after the first request was made, and only after rejection of at least two Prime Ministerial candidates).
 Calls referendums (after consultation with Parliament). Such referendums are advisory and Parliament may choose not to implement their result. However, if a referendum is valid (this requires a majority vote in favour and above 30 percent turnout), Parliament may not legislate contrary to the referendum result.

In foreign affairs:
 Undertakes state, official and working visits overseas. 
 Concludes international treaties negotiated by the Government and submits them to Parliament for ratification.
 Appoints and recalls ambassadors and diplomatic envoys on the advice of the Prime Minister and the Minister of Foreign Affairs (following such advice is not mandatory).
 Receives letters of credence from foreign diplomatic envoys.
 Approves the setting up, closing down, or change in rank of diplomatic missions.

In defence issues:
 Exerts the role of Commander-in-Chief of the Armed Forces.
 Presides over the Supreme Council of National Defence.
 Declares mobilisation of the Armed Forces, subject to prior approval from Parliament (or, in special circumstances, subsequent approval).
 Acts to repel armed aggression towards the country.
 Institutes the state of siege or the state of emergency (nationally or locally, with subsequent parliamentary approval).

Other duties:
 Confers decorations and titles of honour.
 Makes appointments to senior military ranks. 
 Makes appointments to public offices as provided by law.
 Grants individual pardons.

In the exercise of his functions, the president issues decrees. Decrees issued under Article 91 (1) and (2), Article 92 (2) and (3), Article 93 (1), and Article 94 a), b) and d) of the Constitution must be countersigned by the Prime Minister in order to take effect.

Impeachment 

An incumbent president who severely violates the Constitution may be suspended by the Parliament in joint session. If the suspension motion passes, there is a call for a referendum of impeachment within no more than 30 days from the suspension.

If the Senate and Chamber of Deputies, in joint session, accuse the president of high treason, the president is suspended from powers and duties by right. The accusations are judged by the High Court of Cassation and Justice. The incumbent president is dismissed by right if found guilty of high treason.

History 

The suspension and impeachment procedure has been implemented three times. The first time regarded President Ion Iliescu, following a statement regarding the returning of the illegally confiscated properties during the years of the Socialist Republic of Romania to the original owners or their heirs. This first attempt in 1995 did not pass the vote in Parliament.

The second attempt was successful, with the person suspended being Traian Băsescu, in office as of April 2007. He became the first president to successfully be suspended and also the first to face an impeachment vote before the people, regarding issues with supposed unconstitutional acts. The impeachment plebiscite was held on 19 May 2007, and Băsescu survived the impeachment attempt. The result was the rejection of the proposal by 24.94% in favor to 75.06% opposed.

The third attempt lead to a second successful suspension in July 2012, again against Traian Băsescu. The referendum was held on 29 July 2012, and the results were 88.7% in favor and 11.3% opposed, with voter turnout calculated to be 46.24%; below the 50% + one vote threshold required at the time the referendum was held. The Constitutional Court did not give a verdict on the validation of the referendum at the time, citing irregularities in the permanent electoral lists. On 21 August, the Court deemed the referendum invalid, and again Băsescu prevailed from being ousted.

Succession 

Should the office of the president become vacant due to resignation, impeachment, permanent inability to perform the duties of office, or death while in office, the president of the Senate or the president of the Chamber of Deputies, in that order, step in as Ad Interim President of Romania. Neither relinquish their position as president of their respective Legislative House for the duration of the ad interim term. An ad interim president cannot address the Parliament, dissolve the Parliament, nor call for a referendum (the impeachment referendum after a motion of suspension is called by Parliament). The vacancy of the office cannot be longer than three months. While the president is suspended, the office is not considered vacant.

List

Latest election

See also 

 Lifespan timeline of heads of state of Romania
 List of heads of state of Romania
 List of presidents of Romania
 List of heads of government of Romania
 List of presidents of Romania by time in office

References

External links 

 Official site of the Romanian presidency

 
1974 establishments in Romania
Romania history-related lists

cy:Rhestr Arlywyddion Rwmania
fr:Chefs d'État roumains
it:Capi di Stato della Romania